Wallace L'Hommedieu (October 8, 1833 – February 8, 1916) was a politician from New York State who served in the New York State Assembly.

Early life
L'Hommedieu was born on October 8, 1833 in Shelby, New York. He was a son of Henry L'Hommedieu (1799–1898) and Almira ( Hathaway) L'Hommedieu (1805–1888).

Career
L'Hommedieu grew up in Shelby where he was a fruit farmer before becoming assessor of Shelby from 1869 to 1896. In 1887, he was elected supervisor of Shelby, the first Republican elected to that position in eleven years. He was re-elected in 1888 and in 1889, declining a re-nomination in 1890. He served in the New York State Assembly from 1890 to 1891.

Personal life
In 1862, L'Hommedieu was married to Frances Marion Berry (1838–1895), a daughter of Col. John Berry and Rhoda Aurora ( Williams) Berry. Together, they were the parents of:

 Avis Marion L'Hommedieu (1863–1943), who married druggist Harvey D. Jump in 1891.
 Irving L'Hommedieu (1865–1931), a New York State Senator who married Christina Breed.
 John Berry L'Hommedieu (1866–1913), a physician of the Department of Public Corrections and Charities of the City of New York.
 Jessie Belle L'Hommedieu (1870–1946)
 Albert Warren L'Hommedieu (1875–1945), who fought in the Spanish–American War and married Mary Ellen Edwards, a daughter of the late General Edwards, in 1902.

L'Hommedieu died on February 8, 1916. His funeral was held at his residence on Maple Ridge and officiated by the Rev. F. J. Milman of the Presbyterian Church.

References

External links

1833 births
1916 deaths
People from Shelby, New York
People from Medina, New York
19th-century American politicians
Republican Party members of the New York State Assembly
Burials in New York (state)